Mark Stanley Crook (29 June 1903 – 1977) was an English professional footballer. An outside right, he played in the Football League for Blackpool, Swindon Town, Wolves, and Luton Town.

References

1903 births
1977 deaths
Sportspeople from Morley, West Yorkshire
English footballers
Association football outside forwards
Wombwell F.C. players
Blackpool F.C. players
Swindon Town F.C. players
Wolverhampton Wanderers F.C. players
Luton Town F.C. players
English Football League players